Jackson/Hinds Library System (JHLS) is the public library system of Jackson and Hinds County in Mississippi.

Branches
 Jackson
 Eudora Welty Library - It is the main library and is in a former Sears building, built circa 1938. As of 2018 the second story has a study area and over 50,000 books. By 2018 the building had multiple maintenance and mold problems, with stairwells that, according to The Clarion Ledger, "are too dangerous to navigate", as well as non-functional elevators, meaning that the second floor was not accessible for safety reasons. Additionally there were sewage and water leaks.
 Margaret Walker Alexander Library
 Bolden/Moore Library
 Medgar Evers Library
 Fannie Lou Hamer Library
 Willie Morris Library
 Richard Wright Library - It is adjacent to Key Elementary School.

 Not in Jackson
 Ella Bess Austin Library (Terry)
 Beverly J. Brown Library (Byram)
 It is behind the Byram City Hall.
 Lois A. Flagg Library (Edwards)
 Annie Thompson Jeffers Library (Bolton)
 Evelyn Taylor Majure Library (Utica)
 Quisenberry Library (Clinton)
 In 2018 the Clinton city government, citing problems with the sanitary condition, closed the library. It stated that it would reopen if the library system revised the terms of the library lease. The two entities came to an agreement and it reopened that year.
 Raymond Library (Raymond)
 It is located at the Hinds Courthouse Annex.

Former 
 Charles Tisdale Library (Jackson) - It opened in 1976. Its namesake was Charles Tisdale, who published a newspaper. Prior to its closure it was the third busiest library system in terms of book checkouts; in 2016 patrons checked out over 16,700 books. In 2017 it had experienced flooding and black mold and was closed by the library system. By 2018 over 34,000 books had been destroyed in the library because loss of power and additional flooding caused the mold to intensify. In 2019 the library system decided to move to a new site, with a tentative plan for one next to McWillie Elementary School. The Jackson city government acquired the former building from the library system in late 2019. By October 2020 unauthorized persons broke into the library and additional flooding had occurred, so the Jackson city government took measures to board up the building. However, in 2021 break-ins and flooding occurred again. That year the library system made plans for a new site. Ashby Foote, council member of Ward 1 of Jackson, criticized the condition of the current Tisdale library.

References

External links

 Jackson/Hinds Library System

Education in Jackson, Mississippi
Education in Hinds County, Mississippi
Public libraries in Mississippi